Dakota Skye may refer to:

 Dakota Skye (actress) (1994–2021), American pornographic actress
 Dakota Skye (film), a 2008 coming of age drama